Sally is an English language feminine given name. The name originated as a pet name for the Hebrew name Sarah, but has since become used independently. It is also a nickname for Salome and Salimeh, which are especially popular in the Eurasian country Georgia. The name peaked in popularity in the U.S. in 1939, when it was ranked 52nd in popularity.

People

Sally Amaki, American singer based in Japan
Sally Armstrong (journalist) (born 1943), Canadian journalist, documentary filmmaker and human rights activist
Sally Barrington, British oncologist and medical researcher
Sally Anne Bowman (1987–2005), British murder victim
Sally Boyden (cyclist) (born 1967), British track and road racing cyclist
Sally Boyden (singer) (born 1966), Australian singer and actor
Sally Bretton, British actress
Sally Carr (born 1945), Scottish singer, lead singer of the 1970s pop group Middle of the Road (band)
Sally Clark (disambiguation)
Sally Cockburn, Canadian-American mathematician
Sally Davies (artist) (born 1956), Canadian painter and photographer, based in New York City
Dame Sally Claire Davies (born 1949), British doctor and government health advisor
Sally Dexter (born 1960), British actress 
Sally Deweese (born 1824), American girl who became a mother at 10 years of age
Sally Douglas (1941–2001), British actress
Sally Ward Lawrence Hunt Armstrong Downs, also known as Sallie Ward, (1827–1896), American socialite
Sally Dynevor (born 1963), British actress
Sally Field (born 1946), American actress
Sally Gunnell (born 1966), British hurdler
Sally Hawkins (born 1976), British actress
Sally Hemings (c. 1773–1835), slave owned by Thomas Jefferson, believed to have had six children by him
Sally Ann Howes (1930–2021), British-American singer and actress
Sally James (presenter) (born 1950), British TV presenter
Sally Jenkins (born 1960), American author and sports journalist
Sally-Anne Jones (1968–2017), British-born terrorist and UN-designated recruiter who is believed to have been killed
Sally Jones, British journalist
Sally Kellerman (1937–2022), American actress and singer
Sally Chepyego Kaptich (born 1985), Kenyan distance runner
Sally Kirkland (born 1941), American actress
Sally Kohn (born 1977), American political commentator
Sally Kosgei, Kenyan politician
Sally Liu, Chinese singer and member of South Korean girl group Gugudan
Sally Mann (born 1951), American photographer
Sally Ann Matthews, (born 1970), British actress
Sally Milgrim, (born 1898), American fashion designer 
Sally Morgan (artist) (born 1951), Australian Aboriginal author, scriptwriter and artist
Sally Morgan, Baroness Morgan of Huyton (born 1959), British politician
Sally Morgan (psychic), British celebrity psychic
Sally Newmarch (born 1975), Australian Olympic rower
Sally Jessy Raphael (born 1935), host of the American talk show Sally
Sally Pearson (born 1986), Australian track and field athlete 
Sally Phillips (born 1969), British actress
Sally Poh (1956–1998), Singaporean beautician and robbery-murder victim
Sally Pressman (born 1981), American actress
Sally Priesand (born 1946), America's first female rabbi ordained by a rabbinical seminary
Sally Rand (1904–1979), American burlesque performer
Sally Reid, Scottish actress
Sally Ride (1951–2012), American physicist and astronaut
Sally Ronk (1912–1986), American economist
Sally Rooney (born 1991), Irish author 
Sally Salminen (1906–1976), Finnish writer
Sally Seymour (died 1824), American pastry chef and restaurateur
Sally Shaw (born 1978), Australian cricketer
Sally Smith (disambiguation)
Sally Hoyt Spofford (1914–2002), American ornithologist 
Sally Struthers (born 1947), American actress and spokeswoman
Sally The Farmer's Daughter, stage name of Beckie Mullen, professional wrestler from the Gorgeous Ladies of Wrestling
Sally Ann Triplett (born 1962), British actress and singer
Sally Wister (1761–1804), American diarist
Sally Yates (born 1960), American lawyer and former acting U.S. Attorney General

Fictional characters
Mustang Sally (song), R&B song about a Sally who rides
Princess Sally Acorn, from the American Sonic the Hedgehog cartoon and comic book
Sally, a character in the 1981 American slasher movie The Prowler
Sally Solomon, a character in (3rd Rock From the Sun) 
The title character of Sally the Witch, a Japanese manga and anime series
Sally (Black Clover), a character in the manga series Black Clover
Sally, a character in the 1993 American stop-motion animated musical dark fantasy movie The Nightmare Before Christmas
Sally Albright, a title character from When Harry Met Sally..., a 1989 American romantic comedy film
Sally Bains, a character from the 1985 American science fiction movie Back to the Future
The title character of Sally Bollywood: Super Detective, a 2009 cartoon series
Sally Bowles, a cabaret singer in Christopher Isherwood's Goodbye to Berlin and the musical Cabaret
Sally Brown, Charlie Brown's little sister
Sally Brooks, a character on This Is Us
Sally Carrera, a Porsche 911 Carrera in the Pixar film Cars
Sally Day, a character from the 1986 film Demons 2
Sally Draper, a character from the American period drama Mad Men
Sally Fletcher, from the Australian soap opera Home and Away
The title character of Sally Forth (syndicated strip), a comic strip
The title character of Sally Forth (Wally Wood) (1968–1974), a comic strip created by Wally Wood
Sally Gold, a girl in Tennessee Williams's Little New Orleans Girl
Sally Hardesty, fictional character in The Texas Chainsaw Massacre franchise
Sally Jackson, the mortal mother of demigod Percy Jackson in Rick Riordan's Percy Jackson and the Olympians and Heroes of Olympus
Sally Jones / Alison Page, a character in the 1997 American martial arts comedy movie Beverly Hills Ninja
Sally Lockhart, in a series of books by Philip Pullman
Sally Metzner, a character from the 1997 film Jack Frost  
Sally Simpson, from the musical Tommy
Sally Syrup, Flapjack’s girlfriend from The Marvelous Misadventures of Flapjack
Sally Tomato, a Mobster in Sing Sing from Breakfast at Tiffany's
Sally (film series), an antisemitic stereotype from the 1910s, played by Ernst Lubitsch
Sally Webster, from the British soap opera Coronation Street
Sally, the subject and partial narrator in some versions of the English folk song Hares on the Mountain

References

Feminine given names
English-language feminine given names
Given names of Hebrew language origin
Modern names of Hebrew origin